Mazzei is a surname. Notable people with the surname include:

Barbara Mazzei, Italian archaeologist
Frank Mazzei (1912–1977), American politician
Júlio Mazzei (1930-2009), Brazilian soccer coach
Mike Mazzei (born 1965), American politician
Philip Mazzei (1730–1816), Italian physician